Rimrock is the sheer rock wall at the upper edge of a plateau, canyon, or geological uplift. It may refer to either the rock formation or to the rock itself. Rimrock may be composed of almost any stone—basalt, gneiss, granite, sandstone, etc.—and is frequently layered. Many times it overlays a softer stone which erodes away underneath. American Indians in the West often used cavities found below rimrock to construct dwellings and granaries.

Geographic placenames

The geologic formation has lent its name to many places in the western United States.

Communities:
Rimrock, Arizona; Yavapai County, northeast of Camp Verde.
Rimrock, California; San Bernardino County, east of San Bernardino.
Rimrock, Montana; Yellowstone County, west of Billings.
Rimrock, Washington; Yakima County, near Rimrock Lake on the Tieton River west of Yakima.
Rim Rock Colony, Montana; Toole County, north of Helena.

Canyons:
Rim Rock Canyon, Orange County, California
Rimrock Valley, Modoc County, California
Rimrock Gulch, Moffat County, Colorado
Rimrock Canyon, Nye County, Nevada
Rim Rock Canyon, Lincoln County, New Mexico
Rimrock Draw, Washakie County, Wyoming
Rim Rock Draw, Johnson County, Wyoming

Cliffs:
Rimrocks, Yellowstone County, Montana
Rimrock, El Paso County, Texas
The Rimrocks, Kane County, Utah

Lakes:
Rimrock Lake, Modoc County, California
Rimrock Lake, Carbon County, Montana
Rimrock Lake, Colfax County, New Mexico
Rimrock Lake, Marion County, Oregon
Rimrock Lake, Yakima County, Washington
Rimrock Lake, Teton County, Wyoming
Rimrock Lake, British Columbia, Canada

Mountains:
Rimrock, Kootenai County, Idaho
Rimrock Butte, Glacier County, Montana
Rimrock Mountain, Hidalgo County, New Mexico

Ridges:
Rim Rocks, Routt County, Colorado
Rim Rock, Grant County, New Mexico
Rim Rock, Elko County, Nevada
Rim Rock, Hood River County, Oregon

High Schools:
Rimrock High School in Bruneau, Idaho

See also
Bluff
Butte
Cliff
Escarpment
Mesa

 
Mountains